Newtown Historic District may refer to:

in the United States
(by state)
Newtown Borough Historic District, Newtown, Connecticut, listed on the NRHP in Connecticut
Newtown Historic District (Newtown, Pennsylvania), listed on the NRHP in Pennsylvania
Newtown Historic District (Copperhill, Tennessee), listed on the NRHP in Tennessee
Newtown Historic District (Newtown, Virginia), listed on the NRHP in Virginia
Newtown Historic District (Staunton, Virginia), listed on the NRHP in Virginia
Newtown-Stephensburg Historic District, Stephens City, Virginia, listed on the NRHP in Virginia